"Kiss You" is the fifth single by New York dance music duo iiO. It was released in 2005 and timed with the release of the band's debut album Poetica.

Track listing

Queen of Clubs Trilogy: The Best of Nadia Ali Remixed

In 2006, Nadia uploaded a re-recorded remix of Kiss You to listen to on her Myspace page and her official website. The remix was completed by Lance Jordan, whom Nadia formed a working relationship after his remix of Something To Lose. The Lance Jordan production of the song was released by Nadia Ali on the Ruby Edition of her Queen of Clubs Trilogy: The Best of Nadia Ali Remixed in 2010.

Charts

External links
Kiss You at Discogs

Songs about kissing
2005 singles
IiO songs
Songs written by Nadia Ali (singer)
2005 songs